The Idaho State Bengals football program represents Idaho State University in college football.  The Bengals play their home games at Holt Arena, an indoor facility on campus in Pocatello, Idaho. Idaho State is a charter member of the Big Sky Conference in NCAA Division I Football Championship Subdivision (FCS) (formerly Division I-AA). Through the 2022 season, the Bengals have an all-time record of 478–545–20. Idaho State's current head coach is Cody Hawkins, who was hired on December 11, 2022.

History

The university and its football team have been known by several names since the program's inaugural season of 1902:
 1902–1914: Academy of Idaho Bantams
 1915–1926: Idaho Technical Tigers
 No team was fielded during the 1918 influenza pandemic
 1927–1934: Idaho Southern Branch Tigers
 1935–1946: Idaho Southern Branch Bengals
 Due to World War II, no team was fielded in 1943 or 1945
 1947–present: Idaho State Bengals

Early history (1902–1934) 

Idaho State first started fielding football in 1902, just one year after the school was established as the Academy of Idaho. From 1902 to 1934, the program had 10 different head coaches, seven of whom coached for less than three seasons. The Bantams and Tigers, as they were known until 1904 and 1934, respectively, were quite successful during this era, with a total record of 117–70–10 (.619). Herbert Cheney, the program's first ever head coach, has the highest winning percentage of any coach in program history, with a record of 5–1–1 (.786).

Guy Wicks era (1935–1940) 
Guy Wicks spent six total seasons with the Bengals, and was also quite successful, accumulating a record of 29–17–1 (.628). He only had one losing season with the program, during 1940 when he went 3–5. Wicks was also the head basketball coach at the school from 1931 to 1941.

John Vesser era (1941–1951) 
Wick's successor, John Vesser, stayed nine total seasons with Idaho State. He was the head coach when Idaho State moved from being an independent program to being a member of the Rocky Mountain Athletic Conference (RMAC). In total, he had a record of 41–27–6 (.595).

Babe Caccia era (1952–1965) 
Babe Caccia played as both a center and a linebacker when he played for Idaho State (then known as Idaho Southern Branch) in 1936 and 1937, and he was arguably the most successful head coach in the history of the program. Babe stayed with the Bengals for 14 seasons, the most of any head coach, and saw six conference titles during his stay. This included the first ever Big Sky title in 1963. After his run as head coach, he became assistant athletic director for Idaho State from 1965 to 1979, and athletic director from 1979 to 1986. For one year in 1976, he acted as line coach for the Edmonton Eskimos (now Edmonton Elks) of the Canadian Football League (CFL). He boasted a fairly successful record of 79–38–2 (.664) with Idaho State.

Leo McKillip era (1966–1967) 
Leo McKillip only coached for two seasons, having a losing record in both of them. He was Idaho State's first head coach to have a winning percentage below .500 since 1904, totaling 4–15 (.211).

Ed Cavanaugh era (1968–1971) 
Ed Cavanaugh took over as head coach in 1968, and he vastly improved over his predecessor, going 20–19 (.596). He was the head coach when Idaho State opened the ASISU Minidome, renamed as Holt Arena in 1988.

Bob Griffin era (1972–1975) 
Bob Griffin took over in 1972, and he remained with Idaho State for four total seasons, accumulating a 21–20 (.512) record. He went on to have a successful career with the Rhode Island Rams after his stay at Idaho State.

Joe Pascale era (1976) 
Joe Pascale only spent one season at Idaho State. During the lone season he led the Bengals, he only earned one win, a close 27–22 triumph over Nevada, and finished with a mark of 1–9 (.100).

Bud Hake era (1977–1979) 
Bud Hake did not post a win percentage much higher than Pascale, but he did lead the team for a total of three seasons. In 1978, the team traveled to Japan, where they played the Utah State Aggies in Nishinomiya on September 3, losing by a score of 10–0. Hake's three-season stay saw a total record of 5–27 (.156), including a winless 0–11 season in 1979.

Dave Kragthorpe era (1980–1982) 
After Hake went winless in 1979, Idaho State fired him and hired Dave Kragthorpe in his place. During his first season, he went 6–5. Just one season later, the 1981 Bengals had a nearly undefeated 12–1 season, and won the NCAA Division I-AA Football Championship, beating Eastern Kentucky, 34–23, in the 1981 Pioneer Bowl. However, the team finished at 3–8 the following season. Across his entire career with the Bengals, Kragthorpe went 21–14 (.667). As of 2022, Kragthorpe is the most recent Idaho State head coach to finish above .500 for his Bengals career.

Jim Koetter era (1983–1987) 
Jim Koetter replaced Kragthorpe in 1983, and led the Bengals to the Division I-AA playoffs in his first season at the helm, where they lost in the first round against Nevada. Koetter finished his run with Idaho State at 23–32–1 (.411).

Garth Hall era (1988–1991) 
Garth Hall was formerly an offensive coordinator at both Tulane and Oregon State before he took his place as head coach in Idaho State. He failed to find much success, finishing 9–33–1 (.214), going 0–11 during his first season as a head coach. Garth coached the last Bengals game that ended in a tie, a 24–24 game against conference rival Portland State in 1987.

Brian McNeely era (1992–1996) 
Brian McNeely took up as head coach after Hall. He was able to find a bit more success, going 21–34 (.382).

Tom Walsh era (1997–1998) 
Tom Walsh was the offensive coordinator for the Los Angeles Raiders of the National Football League (NFL) before he started his career in Idaho State. He totaled 6–16 (.261) during his two-season stay with Idaho State.

Larry Lewis era (1999–2006) 
Larry Lewis took over after Walsh, and he stayed eight total seasons with the Bengals. In 2002, he and the Bengals were tri-Big Sky Champions, sharing the champion title with Montana and Montana State. However, Idaho State was passed up for the playoffs in favor of the other two. Lewis ended his run with a record of 40–49 (.449).

John Zamberlin era  (2007–2010) 

John Zamberlin was head coach at Central Washington before he went to Idaho State. He was highly successful with Central Washington, winning four conference championships with them, but he struggled when he went to Idaho State. Zamberlain's contract was originally going to run out in 2009, but Idaho State extended the contract by two seasons. The choice was very controversial among students due to the team's lack of success. He averaged only 1.5 wins per season, and he ended his career 6–39 (.133), the second-lowest winning percentage in program history. He was later a linebackers coach for the Hamilton Tiger-Cats of the CFL from 2012 to 2013.

Mike Kramer era (2011–2016) 
Mike Kramer was previously head coach at both Eastern Washington and Montana State, winning one conference title with Eastern Washington and three with Montana State. His most successful season came with the 2014 Bengals, who had a record of 8-4 and finished the season ranked 25th in the FCS, but overall he totaled 18–50 (.265).

Rob Phenicie era (2017–2021) 
In 2017, Kramer resigned as head coach, and Idaho State promoted wide receivers coach Rob Phenicie to head coach the same day. After five seasons with a cumulative record of 16–35 (.314), Phenicie was fired on November 20, 2021.

Charlie Ragle era (2022) 
On December 10, 2021, former California special teams coordinator Charlie Ragle was hired to be the Bengals' head coach. On November 28, 2022, less than a year after being hired, Ragle left the Bengals after his first season, accumulating only one win. He currently holds the record for the lowest win percentage in program history (.091).

Conference affiliations
Idaho State's conference affiliations have been as follows:
 Independent (1902–1949, 1961–1962)
 Rocky Mountain Athletic Conference (1950–1960)
 Big Sky Conference (1963–present)

Championships

National championships

Conference championships
Idaho State has won eight conference championships, spanning two conferences.

 Co-champions

Undefeated seasons
Idaho State has had seven undefeated seasons, under five different head coaches.

Postseason results

Bowl games
The Bengals have appeared in, and won, two bowl games.

 Pioneer Bowl was an alternate name for the 1981 championship game, below.

Division I-AA/FCS playoffs
The Bengals have appeared in the I-AA/FCS playoffs two times with a record of 3–1. They were National Champions in 1981.

National Award Winners

National Football Foundation National Scholar-Athlete Award

All-Americans
The Bengals have had five two-time All-Americans: wide receiver Eddie Bell ('68–'69), defensive end Josh Hays ('95–96), placekicker Pete Garces ('98–'99), defensive end Jared Allen ('02–'03), and punter David Harrington ('10–'11). Allen also won the prestigious Buck Buchanan Award in 2003 as the top defensive player in the nation in Division I-AA. Wide receiver Rodrick Rumble was an All-American in 2011, a season in which he broke the Big Sky conference record for receptions with 112. Return specialist Tavoy Moore was given first-team All-American honors by the American Football Coaches Association (AFCA) for the 2010 season. Quarterback Mike Machurek was named a Kodak All-American for his 1981 championship season. Punter Jon Vanderwielen earned several All-American honors in 2009.

Head coaches

 The program did not field a team during 1943 and 1945.

Source:

Several head coaches have been inducted to the university's athletic hall of fame:
 Ralph Hutchinson – football (as player), basketball (as player), baseball (as coach)
 Felix Plastino – football (as player)
 Guy Wicks – football (as coach), basketball (as coach)
 John Vesser – football (as coach), athletic director
 Babe Caccia – football (as player), wrestling (as player)
 Jim Koetter – football (as player), track & field (as player)

Facilities

Detail about the team's early facilities is lacking. Before the 1922 season, there was a shared athletic field used by the football, baseball, and track programs, with "practically no provision for the comfort of spectators."

Hutchinson Field
On November 4, 1922, the football team played its first game on Hutchinson Field, named after head coach Ralph Hutchinson. There were separate football and baseball fields, surrounded by a quarter-mile track, and provisions for bleachers to hold 5000 spectators along with automobile parking. This field was used until partway through the 1936 season. The area is now the Hutchinson Memorial Quadrangle (located at ).

Spud Bowl

Hutchinson Field was replaced by an outdoor stadium in 1936. The first game held there was a 19–32 loss to the Montana State Bobcats on November 11, 1936. Newspaper reports indicate the stadium was named the "Spud Bowl" during the 1946 season. It remained the team's home field through the 1969 season. At the south end of campus, the former Spud Bowl is now Davis Field (named for William E. Davis and located at ), which continues as the home venue for outdoor track and field and soccer.

Holt Arena

The team's current home venue is an indoor arena that was conceived by ISU athletic director Milton W. "Dubby" Holt in 1966. ISU students voted to appropriate not more than $2.8 million to the project two years later. Originally named the ASISU MiniDome, it was renamed Holt Arena in 1988 to honor Holt. The arena replaced the Spud Bowl as the Bengals' home football stadium in 1970.

The arena is an indoor multi-purpose athletic stadium located on the north end of the ISU campus. Completed in September 1970, it is the oldest enclosed stadium on a college campus in the United States and the second-oldest overall. Only the Astrodome in Houston, completed in 1965, predates it.

Rivalries

Idaho 

Idaho State and Idaho have a rivalry that can be traced all the way back to 1916 when they played their first game against each other, with Idaho winning, 32–0. They have played 42 rivalry games since then. Idaho won the first 8 games in the series, but Idaho State snapped that winning streak in 1969 with a high scoring 47–42 victory. The rivalry remained competitive throughout the 1970s and 1980s, neither team three-peating throughout that period, but the rivalry entered another stale stretch in 1988, Idaho winning the next 7 games. Idaho State ended the streak in 1995. In 1996, Idaho moved up to Division I-A, now the Football Bowl Subdivision (FBS), and the rivalry halted. The two schools played each other only 4 times during Idaho's stay in the FBS, Idaho winning all of them. In 2018, Idaho moved back down to Division I Football Championship Subdivision (FCS), and rejoined the Big Sky Conference. Since then, they have played an annual rivalry game dubbed "Battle of the Domes", Idaho State winning the first game under that branding, 62–28.

Weber State 

Idaho State and Weber State first played each other in October 1962. However, the two teams weren't rivals until Idaho moved to Division I-A in 1996, leaving Idaho State without an in-state rival, which left Weber State as the closest in-conference school to Idaho State. Weber State is Idaho State's most played rival, as they have played each other annually since both joined the Big Sky Conference as charter members in July 1963. The rivalry is also protected by the conference, so they are guaranteed to play each other once per season.

Portland State 

Portland State first joined the Big Sky Conference in 1996, and has become one of Idaho State's conference protected rivals.

All-time record vs. Big Sky teams

As of the 2021 season, ISU has the following records against other Big Sky teams.

Idaho State players in the NFL

 DE - Jeff Charleston (2006–2012); Super Bowl XLIV champion, First-team All-Big sky, Big Sky newcomer of the year, Big Sky co-defensive P.O.Y.
DE - Jared Allen (2004–2015); 4 time first team All-Pro, 5 time Pro Bowl, 2 time NFL sacks leader, winner of the Buck Buchanan Award 
RB - Merrill Hoge (1987–1994)
C - Evan Dietrich-Smith (2009-2018); Super Bowl XLV champion
WR - Eddie Bell (1970–1976)
QB - Mike Machurek (1982–1984); Division 1-AA National champion, AP All-American, All-Big Sky
C - Will Grant (1978–1987)
TE - Mike Hancock (1973–1974)
P - Eddie Johnson (2003–2008)
DE - Bob Otto (1985–1987); Second-team All-Big Sky
OL - John Roman (1976–1982)
LB - Tom Toner (1973–1977); Idaho State Sports Hall of Fame
T - Brian Vertefeuille (1974)
S - Jim Wagstaff (1958–1962); Second-team All-AFL, All-RMC
P - Case deBruijn (1982)

Notable games 
Utah Aggies 136, Idaho Tech 0, on October 11, 1919: Idaho State (then known as Idaho Technical Institute) lost to Utah State (then known as Utah Agricultural College) by a score of 136–0.

Idaho 1, Idaho State 0, on November 11, 1978: In the conference finale for both teams in 1978, a night game was scheduled in Moscow, Idaho. ISU planned to fly up to the Palouse that afternoon in two vintage airplanes. One developed engine trouble shortly after takeoff from Pocatello and returned. Both teams were at the bottom of the Big Sky standings and the game was not rescheduled; Idaho was granted a  forfeit win.

Idaho State 34, Eastern Kentucky 23, on December 19, 1981: Possibly the most memorable game in Idaho State history was the 1981 NCAA Division I-AA Football Championship Game against Eastern Kentucky. Idaho State defeated Rhode Island and South Carolina State on their way to the title game, then known as the Pioneer Bowl. Coach Dave Kragthorpe led the Bengals to an 11-point victory and the national title.

Idaho State 30, Nevada 28, on September 16, 2017: One of the most memorable games in recent Idaho State history came against Nevada in 2017. Idaho State had lost each of their prior 10 games against Nevada, and were 33.5 point underdogs against the Wolf Pack. However, the Bengals were able to pull off a stunning upset, beating Nevada, 30–28. Nevada nearly pulled off a late game comeback, scoring 14 points in the fourth quarter, but were ultimately unable to squeak by Idaho State. This was the first time Idaho State had beaten a school in the Football Bowl Subdivision (FBS) since defeating Utah State in 2000.

See also
Idaho State Bengals football players, a list of notable players for the team

References

External links
 

 
1902 establishments in Idaho
American football teams established in 1902